The Cathedral Basilica of Our Lady of the Snows  also called João Pessoa Cathedral is a Catholic church located in the old town of João Pessoa, capital of the state of Paraiba in Brazil. It is the seat of the Archdiocese of Paraíba.

A church dedicated to Our Lady of the Snows was built on a hill by the first settlers of Paraiba in 1586. It was a simple building, mud, which was rebuilt in the early seventeenth century. In 1639, a Dutch chronicler Elias Herckmans, refers to it as yet unfinished in its Overview of the Captaincy of Paraiba. The construction and renovation continued during the seventeenth and eighteenth centuries, always in the midst of economic difficulties.

In 1894 it was declared cathedral.

See also
Roman Catholicism in Brazil
Our Lady of the Snows (disambiguation)
Church of Mercy
Church and Convent of Our Lady of the Rosary
Monastery of St. Benedict
Church of Saint Peter Gonzalez
São Francisco Cultural Center

References

Roman Catholic cathedrals in Paraíba
Buildings and structures in João Pessoa, Paraíba
Roman Catholic churches completed in 1586
Roman Catholic churches in Paraíba
16th-century Roman Catholic church buildings in Brazil